Patrice Tillie (born 3 November 1964) is a French water polo player. He competed in the men's tournament at the 1992 Summer Olympics.

References

External links
 

1964 births
Living people
French male water polo players
Olympic water polo players of France
Water polo players at the 1992 Summer Olympics
Sportspeople from Algiers